There is also Flagstaff Hill (as a geographical feature), one near Burra and Renmark in South Australia

Flagstaff Hill is a suburb in the City of Onkaparinga local government area. It is named after the hill by that name in the area, where Colonel William Light erected a flagstaff during his survey, which was then used as a trig point. Flagstaff Hill is a leafy suburb established around the Sturt Gorge Recreation Park, maintaining many parks and reserves throughout the suburb.

History
Colonel William Light's survey teams worked south from Adelaide throughout 1838 and 1839, leaving various marks across the landscape. One such mark was a trig point or flagstaff that was left at a grid reference of 783 192. By 1842, the area near this trig point was called the Flagstaff.

During the late nineteenth century, the Flagstaff was located in a farming and grazing region. In the 1960s, some of the land near the Flagstaff had been earmarked for suburban development.

In 1960, Hooker Rex Estates began purchasing land in the region for subdivision and over the next decade had accumulated nearly two hundred hectares. Blocks were first subdivided in the vicinity of a golf course, planners also provided an oval and recreation facilities. The first 130 blocks were released in April 1967 and sold rapidly. By 1984, all developed land had been sold.

From 1985 the suburb was extended when a portion of Minda Home's Craigburn Farm was subdivided by Essington Ltd. This division was spoken of as 'landmark residential development', due to the retention of large trees and waterways and subdivisions that fitted with the shape and orientation of the land.

Amenities

Facilities in Flagstaff Hill include:
 Flagstaff Hill R-7 School (formerly Flagstaff Hill Primary Schools)
 Craigburn Primary School
 Flagstaff Hill Kindergarten
 Flagstaff Oval Kindergarten
 Flagstaff Hill Golf Club & Koppamurra Ridgway Restaurant
 Flagstaff Hill Community Centre
 Flagstaff Hill Scout and Guide Complex
 Sturt Gorge Recreation Park
 Flagstaff Hill Shopping Centre
 Flagstaff Hill Golf Course

The shopping centre facilities consist of an IMVS pathology clinic, Flagstaff Hill Chicken & Seafood fish and chippery, Ray White real estate agency, Baker's Pantry bakery, Flagstaff Hill Newsagency post office/newsagency, Chemmart pharmacy, butcher, Allied Health Services, Foodland supermarket and a Cellarbrations bottle shop.

Sport
The team sports hub of Flagstaff Hill is the Flagstaff Hill Sports and Community Centre, home of the Flagstaff Hill Football Club, Flagstaff Hill Cricket Club, Flagstaff Hill Tennis Club, Flagstaff Athletics, Happy Valley Netball Club and Southern Hills Little Athletics.
Flagstaff Hill Golf Course is a 18-hole golf course for members and the public. Bar and dining facilities are also available.

Politics

Federal
Flagstaff Hill is covered by one Federal Electoral Division, the federal Division of Kingston whose representative is Amanda Rishworth (Australian Labor Party)

State
Flagstaff Hill is covered by the state electoral district of Davenport, whose current member is Erin Thompson (Australian Labor Party).

Local
Flagstaff Hill is part of the Thalassa Ward of the City of Onkaparinga, represented by Councillors Marion Themeliotis and Geoff Eaton.

See also
 List of Adelaide suburbs

Notes

  History of the City of Onkaparinga'' 

Suburbs of Adelaide